Governor Warren may refer to:

Earl Warren (1891–1974), 30th Governor of California
Francis E. Warren (1844–1929), 1st Governor of Wyoming
Fuller Warren (1905–1973), 30th Governor of Florida